The Society of Jesus is a 2004 Croatian drama film directed by Silvije Petranović, starring Leona Paraminski and Milan Pleština. The screenplay, written by Petranović, is based on 's 1969 novel of the same name.

Cast
 Milan Pleština - Father Had
 Leona Paraminski - Countess Maria
 Ivica Vidović - Father Ivan
 Maša Petranović - Countess's Daughter
 Mustafa Nadarević - Castelan
 Matija Prskalo - Castelan's Wife
 Galliano Pahor - Provincial
 Darko Milas - Rector
 Livio Badurina - Archbishop
 Bojan Navojec - Bacvar
 Dejan Aćimović - Abot
 Leon Lučev - Vojnik
 Zoran Čubrilo - Admontor
 Vlatko Dulić - Seljak
 Krešimir Mikić - Zabavljac Sefard

References

External links
 

2004 films
2000s Croatian-language films
2004 drama films
Films set in the 17th century
Society of Jesus
Films based on Czech novels
2004 directorial debut films
Croatian drama films